Semyon Sergeyevich Antonov (born July 18, 1989) is a Russian professional basketball player for CSKA Moscow of the VTB United League. He also represents the senior Russian national team, winning bronze medals at European and Olympic level.

Professional career
Antonov started his profession career with Avtodor Saratov in 2006. He stayed in the club until the end of 2008–09 season, and moved to TSU Basket Tambov for one season. In 2011, he moved to Nizhny Novgorod where he stayed for six seasons.

On June 17, 2016, Antonov signed a two-year contract with the option of another year with the Russian team CSKA Moscow. On June 21, 2021, Antonov renewed his contract with CSKA for three more seasons.

Russian national team
Antonov was a member of the junior national teams of Russia. With Russia's junior national teams, he played at the 2007 FIBA Europe Under-18 Championship, the 2008 FIBA Europe Under-20 Championship, and the 2009 FIBA Europe Under-20 Championship.

He has also been a member of the senior Russian national basketball team. With Russia's senior team, he played at the EuroBasket 2011, where he won a bronze medal, and at the 2012 Summer Olympics, where he won a bronze medal. He has also played at the EuroBasket 2013, the EuroBasket 2015, and the EuroBasket 2017.

Career statistics

EuroLeague

|-
| style="text-align:left;"| 2014–15
| style="text-align:left;"| Nizhny Novgorod
| 24 || 23 || 25.6 || .444 || .384 || .700 || 3.3 || 1.7 || .5 || .6 || 7.1 || 5.3
|-
| style="text-align:left;"| 2016–17
| style="text-align:left;" rowspan=6| CSKA Moscow
| 28 || 3 || 8.7 || .468 || .538 || 1.000 || 1.1 || .3 || .3 || .3 || 2.1 || 1.4
|-
| style="text-align:left;"| 2017–18
| 34 || 22 || 13.8 || .500 || .400 || .727 || 2.1 || .6 || .4 || .5 || 4.2 || 4.0
|-
| style="text-align:left;background:#AFE6BA;"| 2018–19†
| 21 || 5 || 7.0 || .474 || .133 || .556 || 1.0 || .1 || .1 || .0 || 1.4 || 1.0
|-
| style="text-align:left;"| 2019–20
| 21 || 0 || 7.5 || .560 || .077 || .786 || 1.3 || .0 || .2 || .1 || 2.0 || 1.7
|-
| style="text-align:left;"| 2020–21
| 32 || 1 || 8.3 || .407 || .458 || .500 || 1.0 || .3 || .2 || .1 || 1.8 || 1.1
|-
| style="text-align:left;"| 2021–22
| 14 || 2 || 7.0 || .800 || .385 || .500 || 0.9 || .1 || .1 || .9 || 2.3 || 1.9
|- class="sortbottom"
| style="text-align:left;"| Career
| style="text-align:left;"|
| 86 || 48 || 15.4 || .435 || .414 || .727 || 2.1 || .8 || .4 || .5 || 4.3 || 3.5

References

External links
Semyon Antonov at euroleague.net
Semyon Antonov at fiba.com (archive)
Semyon Antonov at eurobasket.com

1989 births
Living people
Basketball players at the 2012 Summer Olympics
BC Avtodor Saratov players
BC Nizhny Novgorod players
Olympic basketball players of Russia
Olympic bronze medalists for Russia
Olympic medalists in basketball
Medalists at the 2012 Summer Olympics
PBC CSKA Moscow players
People from Nizhnevartovsk
Power forwards (basketball)
Russian men's basketball players
Small forwards
Universiade gold medalists for Russia
Universiade medalists in basketball
2019 FIBA Basketball World Cup players
Medalists at the 2013 Summer Universiade
Sportspeople from Khanty-Mansi Autonomous Okrug